Tommaso is a 2019 internationally co-produced drama film, written and directed by Abel Ferrara. It stars Willem Dafoe. The film had its world premiere at the 72nd Cannes Film Festival on 20 May 2019. It was released in the United States on 5 June 2020 by Kino Lorber.

Plot
The story follows an American artist living in Rome with his young European wife and their 3-year-old daughter.

Cast
 Willem Dafoe as Tommaso
 Cristina Chiriac as Nikki
 Anna Ferrara as Deedee

Release
The film had its world premiere at the 72nd Cannes Film Festival in the Special Screenings section on 20 May 2019. In January 2020, Kino Lorber acquired U.S. distribution rights to the film. It was released in the United States on 5 June 2020.

Reception

Box office
Tommaso grossed $0 in North America (due to the ongoing COVID-19 pandemic, and Kino Lorber virtual cinema strategies) and $27,136 worldwide.

Critical response
The website's critical consensus reads, "While admittedly a self-indulgent exercise, Tommaso is powerfully anchored by an outstanding central performance from Willem Dafoe." On Metacritic, it holds a rating of 66 out of 100, based on 19 critics, indicating "generally favorable reviews".

References

External links
 
 

2019 films
2019 drama films
American drama films
Italian drama films
Greek drama films
English-language Italian films
English-language Greek films
2010s Italian-language films
Films directed by Abel Ferrara
Films scored by Joe Delia
Films set in Rome
2010s English-language films
2010s American films